Matthew White Ridley, 3rd Viscount Ridley    (16 December 1902 – 25 February 1964) was a British peer, landowner, public servant and race car driver. He was also the third Baron Wensleydale and seventh Baronet Ridley.

Biography

Early life and education
Ridley was the son and heir of Matthew White Ridley, 2nd Viscount Ridley and Rosamond Cornelia Gwladys Guest, daughter of Ivor Guest, 1st Baron Wimborne. He succeeded to the family titles when he was just 13 years old, after his father's death on 14 February 1916. He attended Eton College and Balliol College, Oxford.

Racing
Ridley was a self-taught engineer and car racing enthusiast. At the family estate, Blagdon Hall, he designed and built his own car to challenge the speed records for Class H vehicles (501 – 750cc). In 1931, he set the record for the "flying kilometre and flying mile" in the International Class A at Brooklands, with mean speeds of 105.42 mph (kilometre) and 104.56 mph (mile). He was badly injured in an accident at Brooklands at the end of the 1931 season, when his car reportedly reached a speed of 112 mph.

Career

He inherited considerable estates in Northumberland (10,000 acres) and devoted his life to public affairs. He was a member of the Northumberland County Council from 1928 to his death, and chairman of the North-East Development Association, the North-East Industrial and Development Association, the Northern Regional Board for Industry, and the Rock Building Society.

In business, he also served as chairman of the Consett Iron Works, director of the Moor Line steamship company, and a member of the board of Lloyds Bank.

Ridley served as an officer in the Northumberland Yeomanry, an honorary colonel of the Tyne Electrical Engineers and was active in the Territorial Army. Nationally he served as Director of Hydrogen Production for the Air Ministry, Director of Producer Gas Vehicles for Ministry of Transport and as North Regional Controller of the Ministry of Production. During the Second World War, he designed an auxiliary engine for Sunderland flying boats.

In 1937, he became chairman of the council of King's College, Newcastle and had a significant role in the creation of the new University of Newcastle upon Tyne.

Viscount Ridley was invested as a Commander of the Order of the British Empire in the 1938 New Year Honours for "public services in Durham and Tyneside".

Family
Ridley married Ursula Lutyens, daughter of Sir Edwin Landseer Lutyens and Lady Emily Bulwer-Lytton (daughter of Robert Bulwer-Lytton, 1st Earl of Lytton), on 13 October 1924.  They had three children together:

 Matthew White Ridley, 4th Viscount Ridley (29 July 1925 – 22 March 2012)
 Nicholas Ridley, Baron Ridley of Liddesdale (17 February 1929 – 4 March 1993)
 Hon. Laura Consuelo Ridley, who married Adrian Carrick.

References

External links
Blagdon Estate: Family History 

Viscounts in the Peerage of the United Kingdom
1902 births
1964 deaths
People from Marylebone
Military personnel from London
Northumberland Hussars officers
Matthew
People educated at Eton College
Alumni of Balliol College, Oxford
British motorsport designers
English racing drivers
English people of Welsh descent
Commanders of the Order of the British Empire
Lutyens family